The 2015–16 season is Kitchee's 37th season in the top-tier division in Hong Kong football. Kitchee will compete in the Premier League, Senior Challenge Shield, FA Cup and 2015 AFC Cup in this season.

Key events
 1 June 2015: The club extends a 2-year contract with club captain Lo Kwan Yee.
 4 June 2015: Hong Kong defender Tong Kin Man joins the club from Sun Pegasus on a free transfer.  Brazilian midfielder Fernando Augusto Azevedo joins the club from YFCMD for an undisclosed fee.
 12 June 2015: Hong Kong midfielder Xu Deshuai leaves the club and joins Eastern for an undisclosed fee.
 16 June 2015: Hong Kong defender Cheung Kin Fung leaves the club and joins South China on a free transfer.
 4 July 2015: Spanish striker Borja Rubiato leaves the club and joins Talavera CF on a free transfer.
 8 July 2015: Hong Kong defender Tsang Chi Hau leaves the club and joins Eastern for an undisclosed fee.
 9 July 2015: Hong Kong defender Tsang Kam To leaves the club and joins Eastern for an undisclosed fee.
 13 July 2015: Hong Kong midfielder Emmet Wan, Ho Chuck Hang and defender Wang Hecun join KC Southern on loan until the end of the season.
 15 July 2015: Hong Kong striker Sham Kwok Keung joins the club from Sun Pegasus on a free transfer. On the other hand, Brazil-born Hong Kong striker Alessandro Leonardo joins the club from Wong Tai Sin on a free transfer.
 15 July 2015: Ngan Chuck Ban, Cheng Chin Lung, Harima Hirokane and Law Tsz Chun are promoted from the youth system.
 23 July 2015: Hong Kong midfielder To Hon To leaves the club and joins Wong Tai Sin for an undisclosed fee.
 23 July 2015: Hong Kong defender Yu Wai Lim leaves the club and joins Tai Po on a free transfer.
 27 July 2015: Hong Kong midfielder Lee Kai Chi leaves the club and joins Yuen Long on a free transfer.
 1 August 2015: Hong Kong midfielder Cho Sung-min leaves the club and joins Citizen on a free transfer.

Players

Squad information

Last update: 28 July 2015
Source: South China Football Team
Ordered by squad number.
LPLocal player; FPForeign player; NRNon-registered player

Transfers

In

Summer

Out

Summer

Loan in

Summer

Loan out

Summer

Club

Coaching staff

Squad statistics

Overall stats
{|class="wikitable" style="text-align: center;"
|-
!width="100"|
!width="60"|League
!width="60"|Senior Shield
!width="60"|FA Cup
!width="60"|Total stats
|-
|align=left|Games played    ||  0  ||  0  ||  0  || 0
|-
|align=left|Games won       ||  0  ||  0  ||  0  || 0
|-
|align=left|Games drawn     ||  0  ||  0  ||  0  || 0
|-
|align=left|Games lost      ||  0  ||  0  ||  0  || 0
|-
|align=left|Goals for       ||  0  ||  0  ||  0  || 0
|-
|align=left|Goals against   ||  0  ||  0  ||  0  || 0
|- =
|align=left|Players used    ||  0  ||  0  ||  0  || 0
|-
|align=left|Yellow cards    ||  0  ||  0  ||  0  || 0
|-
|align=left|Red cards       ||  0  ||  0  ||  0  || 0
|-

Appearances and goals
Key

No. = Squad number

Pos. = Playing position

Nat. = Nationality

Apps = Appearances

GK = Goalkeeper

DF = Defender

MF = Midfielder

FW = Forward

Numbers in parentheses denote appearances as substitute. Players with number struck through and marked  left the club during the playing season.

Top scorers

The list is sorted by shirt number when total goals are equal.

Disciplinary record
Includes all competitive matches.Players listed below made at least one appearance for Southern first squad during the season.

Substitution record
Includes all competitive matches.

Last updated: 25 July 2015

Captains

Competitions

Overall

Premier League

Classification

Results summary

References

Kitchee SC seasons
Hong Kong football clubs 2015–16 season